Canciones de Mi Padre (Spanish for "Songs of My Father", or "My Father's Songs") is American singer Linda Ronstadt's first album of Mexican traditional Mariachi music.

History
The album was released in late 1987 and immediately became a global smash hit. At 2½ million US sales, it stands as the biggest selling non-English language album in American record history. This album has been RIAA certified double-platinum (for over 2 million US copies sold) and also won Ronstadt the Grammy Award for Best Mexican/Mexican-American Album at the 31st Grammy Awards.

These canciones were a big part of Ronstadt's family tradition and musical roots. The title Canciones de Mi Padre refers to a booklet that the University of Arizona published in 1946  for Ronstadt's deceased aunt, Luisa Espinel, who had been an international singer in the 1920s.  The songs come from Sonora and Ronstadt included her favorites on the album. Also, Ronstadt has credited the late Mexican singer Lola Beltrán as an influence in her own singing style, and she recalls how a frequent guest to the Ronstadt home, Eduardo "Lalo" Guerrero, father of Chicano music, would often serenade her as child with these songs.

In the accompanying printed material, each song's Spanish lyrics were paired with an English translation and a discussion of the song's background or its significance for Ronstadt (omitted on the CD). Rubén Fuentes served as musical director/bandleader. Follow-up albums include Mas Canciones, Frenesí, and the Rhino Records compilation Mi Jardin Azul: Las Canciones Favoritas, which collects songs from the previous three Spanish-language albums.
Las Canciones de mi Padre also is the only recording production in the world that used the 3 best Mariachi bands in the world: Mariachi Vargas, Mariachi Los Camperos and Mariachi Los Galleros de Pedro Rey. 
As of 2012, Canciones de Mi Padre had sold nearly 10 million copies worldwide.

Although sometimes referred to as Ronstadt's first Spanish-language recordings, in fact she had recorded several times in the language before, including "Lo Siento mi Vida", a song she co-wrote with her father for her 1976 album, Hasten Down the Wind, and "Lago Azul," a Spanish translation of "Blue Bayou", that was released as a single following her hit English version from her 1977 album, Simple Dreams.

In 2021, it was announced that Canciones de Mi Padre had been inducted into the Grammy Hall of Fame.

In 2022, the album was selected by the Library of Congress for preservation in the National Recording Registry.

Track listing

Personnel 
 Linda Ronstadt – vocals
Michael J. Ronstadt – vocals
Danny Valdez – vocals, guitar
Gilberto Puente – guitar
Jorge Lopez – guitar
Samuel Gutierrez – guitar
Pedro Flores – vihuela
Victor "el Pato" Cardenas – vihuela
Felipe Perez – violin
Antonio Ramos – violin
Salvador Torres – violin
Heriberto Molina – vocals
Ricardo Cisneros – vocals
Steve Fowler – flute
Ron Kalina – harmonica
Juan Gudiño – Trumpet
Ignacio N Gomez – Trumpet
Jim Self – tuba
Larry Bunker – percussion
Pedro Rey – vocals w/Linda Ronstadt
Pedro Rey Jr. – vocals

Production 
 Peter Asher – producer
 Ruben Fuentes – producer, arrangements, conductor 
 Edd Kolakowski – assistant producer
 Shawn Murphy – recording, mixing
 Sharon Rice – assistant engineer
 Dwayne Seykora – assistant engineer
 Doug Sax – mastering
 José Hernández – album coordinator 
 John Kosh – art direction, design 
 Bob Blakeman – photography
 Gilbert Ronstadt – back cover painting 
 J. Roy Helland – make-up, hair stylist 
 Manuel – wardrobe design
 Janet Stark – assistant to Miss Ronstadt

Charts

Sales and certifications

See also
 List of best-selling Latin albums

References

Linda Ronstadt albums
Mariachi albums
Grammy Award for Best Mexican/Mexican-American Album
1987 albums
Albums produced by Peter Asher
Elektra Records albums
Spanish-language albums
Latin music albums by American artists
Covers albums
United States National Recording Registry recordings
United States National Recording Registry albums